Beware of the Dogs is the debut studio album by Australian indie pop musician Stella Donnelly, released on 8 March 2019 by Secretly Canadian.

The album was nominated for various awards in 2019 and 2020, including Australian Album of the Year for the J Awards and Breakthrough Artist at the ARIA Music Awards. In 2020, the album won Independent Album of the Year and Best Independent Pop Album at the AIR Awards.

Background
Donnelly independently released her debut EP, Thrush Metal, in 2017. She was signed to Secretly Canadian in February 2018, while Thrush Metal was re-released by the label that June. One song off of Thrush Metal, "Boys Will Be Boys", was included on Beware of the Dogs.

Critical reception

Many reviewers praised Donnelly's songwriting and the album's discussion of topics like the #MeToo movement and toxic masculinity. For NME, Hannah Mylrea wrote the record is "an enthralling and deeply relevant debut", praising its "searing lyrics" and playfulness. Jon Dolan of Rolling Stone commended its composition, writing "the glazed guitars, sunny Casio beat and pure spirit of her songwriting keeps her shaky reality rolling forward."

Olivia Horn of Pitchfork wrote that Stella's music is "empathetic to the core", and praised her "impressively dexterous voice, which she puts to work in service of some of her album’s most winsome moments."

Reviewing for Vice, Robert Christgau said the album is, "in plain English and unassuming soprano, a musical encyclopedia of assholes, all male not just because she's female but because assholes generally are."

Track listing
All tracks written by Stella Donnelly. All tracks produced by Dean Tuza, except "Boys Will Be Boys" by Jordan Shakespeare and "U Owe Me" by Drew Vandenberg.

 "Old Man" – 3:33
 "Mosquito" – 3:11
 "Season's Greetings" – 2:49
 "Allergies" – 2:55
 "Tricks" – 4:06
 "Boys Will Be Boys" – 4:04
 "Lunch" – 3:40
 "Bistro" – 2:03
 "Die" – 2:54
 "Beware of the Dogs" – 3:35
 "U Owe Me" – 2:40
 "Watching Telly" – 4:45
 "Face It" – 2:17

Personnel
Musicians
 Stella Donnelly – vocals (all tracks), bass (track 2), guitar (tracks 1-7, 10, 11, 13), percussion (track 1), piano (tracks 2, 3, 10, 11), synth (tracks 7-9, 12, 13), writing, composing
 Jennifer Aslett – bass (tracks 1, 3, 5, 8-10, 12), guitar (track 7), vocals (track 12)
 Indigo Foster-Tuke – vocals (track 12)
 Miranda Murray Yong – cello (track 7)
 George Foster – drums (track 7), guitar (tracks 1, 3, 5, 8, 10), synth (track 12)
 Talya Valenti – drums (tracks 1, 3, 5, 8-10, 12), percussion (tracks 1, 3, 7, 12), vocals (track 12)
 Dean Tuza – drum machine (track 9)

Technical
 Matt Colton – mastering
 Tony Espie – mixing
 Ewan Pearson – mixing
 Jordan Shakespeare – engineer, producer (6)
 Dean Tuza – engineer, producer (1-5, 7-10, 12-13)
 Drew Vandenberg – engineer, producer (11)

Promotional
 Pooneh Ghana – cover photography
 Nathaniel David Utesch – design

Charts

References

External links
 

2019 debut albums
Stella Donnelly albums
Secretly Canadian albums